Edwin Ellis Jacob (10 April 1878 – 3 December 1964) was a British sailor who competed in the 1924 Summer Olympics. He was born in Kensington. In 1924 he won the silver medal as crew member of the British boat Emily in the 8 metre class event.

References

External links
Edwin Jacob's profile at Sports Reference.com

1878 births
1964 deaths
British male sailors (sport)
Medalists at the 1924 Summer Olympics
Olympic medalists in sailing
Olympic sailors of Great Britain
Olympic silver medallists for Great Britain
Sailors at the 1924 Summer Olympics – 8 Metre